Leonard Penn (13 November 1907 – 20 May 1975) was an American film, television and theatre actor.

Early life and education
Penn was born in Springfield, Massachusetts, to parents Marcus Penn and Eva Monson. He majored in drama at Columbia University. 

During World War II, Penn served in Navy intelligence.

Career
Known for his work in film serials and bit parts in major films, Penn appeared in 81 films and 27 television productions between 1937 and 1960. Penn also appeared in six Broadway-theatre productions in New York City between 1934 and 1941. His Broadway appearances were in The Distant City (1941), Lady in Waiting (1940), Paths of Glory (1935), Field of Ermine (1935), Between Two Worlds (1934), and Personal Appearance (1934).

Personal life
Penn married actress Gladys George in New Haven, Connecticut on September 18, 1935. They remained wed until 1944.  They both appeared in Marie Antoinette.

In 1947, Penn married Louise Arthur Sharp in Los Angeles.

Death
On May 20, 1975, Penn died in Los Angeles, California. He was 67 years old.

Selected filmography

 Song of the City (1937) - Fisherboy (uncredited)
 Between Two Women (1937) - Tony Woolcott
 Bad Guy (1937) - First Detective (uncredited)
 The Firefly (1937) - Etienne
 The Women Men Marry (1937) - Quinn
 The Ship That Died (1938) - Bob
 Arsène Lupin Returns (1938) - Reporter (uncredited)
 The Girl of the Golden West (1938) - Pedro
 Judge Hardy's Children (1938) - Steve Prentiss
 Three Comrades (1938) -  Tony (uncredited)
 The Toy Wife (1938) - Gaston Vincent
 Ladies in Distress (1938) - Daniel J. Roman
 Woman Against Woman (1938) - Fred Barnes (uncredited)
 Marie Antoinette (1938) - Toulan
 Young Dr. Kildare (1938) - Albert Foster (uncredited)
 Almost A Gentleman (1939) - Arthur Gates
 Bachelor Mother (1939) - Jerome Weiss
 The Day the Bookies Wept (1939) - Man at Racetrack (uncredited)
 The Way of All Flesh (1940) - Joe
 The Best Years of our Lives (1946) - (uncredited)
 Chick Carter, Detective (1946) - Vasky
 High School Hero (1946) - Prof. Farrell
 Son of the Guardsman (1946) - Mark Crowell
 I Cover Big Town (1947) - Norden Royal
 The Hat Box Mystery (1947) - Stevens
 Killer at Large (1947) - Brent Maddux
 Hoppy's Holiday (1947) - Dunning
 Brick Bradford (1947, Serial) - Eric Byrus
 The Dead Don't Dream (1948) - Earl Wesson
 Partners of the Sunset (1948) - Les
 Superman (1948, Serial) - Electronics Store Owner / Henchman (uncredited)
 The Three Musketeers (1948) - Musketeer (uncredited)
 Outlaw Brand (1948) - Brent
 Congo Bill (1949) - Andre Bocar
 Courtin' Trouble (1949) - Dawson (uncredited)
 Batman and Robin (1949, Serial) - Carter - Hammil's Valet
 The Adventures of Sir Galahad (1949) - Sir Modred - The Black Knight
 Range Land (1949) - Bart Sheldon
 The Pilgrimage Play (1949) - Judas Iscariot
 The Girl from San Lorenzo (1950) - Tom McCarger
 Six Gun Mesa (1950) - Carson
 Women from Headquarters (1950) - Police Officer Allen
 Gunfire (1950) - Dan Simons
 Silver Raiders (1950) - Lance Corbin
 Lonely Heart Bandits (1950) - Detective Stanley
 Law of the Badlands (1951) - Cash Carlton
 The Sword of Monte Cristo (1951) - Conspirator (uncredited)
 Wanted: Dead or Alive (1951) - Sid Taggart - Gang Leader
 Sirocco (1951) - Rifat (uncredited)
 Stagecoach Driver (1951) - George Barnes
 Mysterious Island (1951, Serial) - Capt. Nemo
 On the Loose (1951) - Dance Judge (uncredited)
 South of Caliente (1951) - Mexican Captain
 The Magic Carpet (1951) - Ramoth's Father - the Caliph (uncredited)
 Thief of Damascus (1952) - Habayah (uncredited)
 A Yank in Indo-China (1952) - Colonel Sablon
 King of the Congo (1952, Serial) - Boris
 Outlaw Women (1952) - Sam Bass
 And Now Tomorrow (1952)
 Barbed Wire (1952) - Steve Ruttledge
 No Holds Barred (1952) - Pete Taylor
 Fangs of the Arctic (1953) - Henchman Morgan
 Savage Mutiny (1953) - Emil Bruno
 The Lost Planet (1953, Serial) - Ken Wopler
 Francis Covers the Big Town (1953) - Brad Mitchell (uncredited)
 Murder Without Tears (1953) - Defense Attorney Parker
 Fort Algiers (1953) - Lt. Picard
 Flame of Calcutta (1953) - Nadir
 Phantom of the Rue Morgue (1954) - Gendarme Dumas (uncredited)
 The Saracen Blade (1954) - Haroun (uncredited)
 King Richard and the Crusaders (1954) - Physician (uncredited)
 A Star Is Born (1954) - Train Station Scene Director (uncredited)
 Drum Beat (1954) - Miller - a Settler (uncredited)
 The Silver Chalice (1954) - Soldier in Banquet Hall (uncredited)
 Day of Triumph (1954) - Pharisee
 Jump Into Hell (1955) - Pvt. Rigault (uncredited)
 To Catch a Thief (1955) - Monaco Policeman (uncredited)
 Menace from Outer Space (1956, TV movie) - Ranger Griff (archive footage)
 The Girl He Left Behind (1956) - Lt. Gen. B.K. Harrison (uncredited)
 In the Money (1958) (last Bowery Boys film) - Don Clarke
 Spartacus (1960) - Garrison Officer (uncredited)

Selected television

References

External links
 
 

1907 births
1975 deaths
20th-century American male actors
American male film actors
American male stage actors
American male television actors
Male actors from Los Angeles
Actors from Springfield, Massachusetts
20th-century American singers
Columbia University alumni